Reunion may refer to:

 Class reunion
 Family reunion

Reunion, Réunion, Re-union, Reunions or The Reunion may also refer to:

Places
 Réunion, a French overseas department and island in the Indian Ocean
 Reunion, Commerce City, Colorado, US
 Reunion, Florida, a resort neighborhood near Orlando, Florida, US
 Holy Empire of Reunion, a Brazilian micronation that claims the French island as its territory
 Reunion District, Dallas, US

Architecture
 Reunion Arena, an indoor arena in Dallas, Texas, US
 Reunion Tower, a building in Dallas, Texas, US

Arts and entertainment

Books
 Reunion (Uhlman novel), a 1971 German language novel by Fred Uhlman
 Reunion (Foster novel), a 2001 science fiction novel by Alan Dean Foster
 Reunion (Cabot novel), a 2005 young-adult novel by Meg Cabot
 "Reunion" (short story), a 1962 short story by John Cheever
 Reunion (play), a play by David Mamet
 Reunion (Buffy comic), a 2002 comic
 The Reunion (Animorphs), a book in the Animorphs science fiction series
 Force Heretic: Reunion, a novel by Sean Williams and Shane Dix
 Knights of the Old Republic: Reunion, a story arc in the Knights of the Old Republic series of comic books

Film
 Reunion (1932 film), a British drama film
 Reunion (1936 film), a film by Norman Taurog
 Reunion (1980 film), a television film by Russ Mayberry
 Reunion (1989 film), a film based on the novella by Fred Uhlman
 Reunion (1977 film), a film by Michael Talbott
 Reunion (1985 film), a television film by Lee Grant
 Reunion (2001 film) or American Reunion, a film by Leif Tilden and Mark Poppi
 Reunion (2009 film), a film starring Derek Cecil
 Reunion (2012 film), a Japanese film by Ryoichi Kimizuka
 Reunion (2015 film), a Finnish film
 Reunion (2018 film), a Bengali film
 Reunion (2020 film), a New Zealand horror film
 Reunion (upcoming film), an American comedy film
 The Reunion (1963 film), an Italian comedy film
 The Reunion (2011 American film), an action film by Michael Pavone
 The Reunion (2011 Danish film), a comedy film by Niels Nørløv
 The Reunion (2012 film), a Filipino comedy-drama romance film
 The Reunion (2013 film), a Swedish film

Games
 Réunion (card game), a 19th-century German card game similar to skat
 Reunion (video game), a space strategy game developed by Amnesty Design in 1995
 X3: Reunion, a computer game produced by Egosoft and released late 2005

Music
 Reunion (band), an ad-hoc group of studio musicians which had a hit with "Life Is a Rock (But the Radio Rolled Me)"
 Re-union (duo), a Dutch musical duo known for representing the Netherlands in the Eurovision Song Contest 2004
 Reunion Records, a Contemporary Christian music label

Albums
 Mel Tormé and the Marty Paich Dektette – Reunion (1988)
 Reunion: The Songs of Jimmy Webb, 1974 album by Glen Campbell
 Reunion (Black Sabbath album) (1998)
 Reunion (Art Ensemble of Chicago album) (2003)
 Reunion (Dune album), an unreleased album
 Reunion (Gary Burton album) (1989)
 Reunion (Odyssey the Band album), (1998)
 Reunion (The Rankin Family album) (2007)
 Reunion (Temptations album) (1982)
 Reunion (Country Joe and the Fish album) (1977)
 Reunion, a 2011 album by Viggo Mortensen
 The Reunion (Capone-N-Noreaga album) (2000)
 The Reunion (Rare Essence album) (2015)
 The Reunion (George Shearing and Stéphane Grappelli album)
 Reunion (Junk Yard Band album) (1996)
 Doomed for Live – Reunion 2002, a live album by Candlemass
 Reunion: A Decade of Solas, the 2006 reunion album by Solas
 Reunion (Peter, Paul and Mary album), a 1978 reunion album by Peter, Paul and Mary
 Reunion, an album by Gary Benson (musician)
 The Reunion, a 1972 Chinese-American opera album by Lisa Lu and company
 Re:Union, an album by Lego Big Morl
 Reunions (album), by Jason Isbell (2020)

Songs
 "Reunion" (M83 song) (2012)
 "Reunion" (ClariS song) (2013)
 "Reunion", a 2012 song by the xx from coexist
 "The Reunion", a 2011 song by Bad Meets Evil from Hell: The Sequel
 "Reunion", a 2005 song by Les Incompétents
 "Reunion", a 1995 song by Collective Soul from Collective Soul
 "Reunion", a 1986 song by Erasure from Wonderland
 "The Reunion", a 1980 song by The Blades
 "Reunion", a 1976 song by Bobby Goldsboro
 "A Reunion", a 1973 song by Gentle Giant from In a Glass House
 "Reunions", a 1971 song by Carly Simon from her eponymous album

Radio
 The Reunion (radio series), a BBC Radio 4 current affairs programme

Television
 Reunion (advertisement), a 2013 YouTube/television advertisement by Google India for Google Search

Series, telemovies, miniseries
 The Dukes of Hazzard: Reunion!, a 1997 made-for-television film
 Reunion (TV series), a 2005 American drama series
 The Reunion (TV series), a Singaporean series
 Dynasty: The Reunion, a 1991 miniseries
 Reunion with James Brolin, a 1990 reality series

Episodes
 "Re: Union" (Farscape episode), a 2000 season 3 number 8 episode 30 of Farscape
 "Reunion" (30 Rock)
 "Reunion" (Amphibia)
 "Reunion" (Angel)
 "Reunion" (Gotham)
 "Reunion" (Harsh Realm)
 "Reunion" (Haven)
 "Reunion" (Law & Order: Criminal Intent)
 "Reunion" (Star Trek: The Next Generation)
 "The Reunion", an episode of Curb Your Enthusiasm
 "Reunion", an episode of Stargate Atlantis
 "Reunion", an episode of The Legend of Korra
 "Reunion: The Remaining Time", an episode of Naruto anime series

Sculpture
 Reunion (Gummer), a 1992 public sculpture by Don Gummer
 Reconciliation (Josefina de Vasconcellos sculpture) or Reunion

Other uses
 Reunion (genealogy software)
 Reunion.com or MyLife

See also

 Class Reunion (disambiguation)
 Family reunion (disambiguation)
 La Reunion (disambiguation)
 Adoption reunion registry
 
 
 Union (disambiguation)
 Re (disambiguation)